Zátopek is a 2021 Czech biographical film about Emil Zátopek. It is directed by David Ondříček and stars Václav Neužil. It was selected as the Czech entry for the Best International Feature Film at the 94th Academy Awards.

Plot
Ron Clarke competes at 1968 Summer Olympics but fails to win any medal. Feeling disappointed that he might have lost his last chance to win an Olympics medal he starts to doubt his career and decides to meet Emil Zátopek whom he adores. The film is about their dialogue during which audience can learn retrospectively about Zátopek's sport career and his life.

Cast
 Václav Neužil as Emil Zátopek
 Martha Issová as Dana Zátopková
  as Josef Dostál
 James Frecheville as Ron Clarke
 Gabriel Andrews as Ron's Trainer
 Sinead Phelps as Helen
 Sean Brodeur as English Soldier
 Anna Schmidtmajerová as Dana's friend
 Filipp Mogilnitskiy as Soviet journalist
 Roy McCrerey as English Commentator
 Daniela Hirsh as Translator
 Kevin Clarke as Disgruntled Spectator

Production
David Ondříček came up with an idea for the film in 2007 and started to work on the screenplay and started to prepare the film after he finished Dukla 61. In 2015, Ondříček started to gather finances for the film and submitted application for a grant from Czech State Fund for Cinematography but was twice rejected. After the release of Ondříček's film Dukla 61, Ondříček's third request was accepted and Zátopek received subsidy of 15 million CZK allowing Ondříček to renew preparations.

Shooting started on 29 April 2019 at Březnice stadium near Příbram. Scenes shot there with the main actors also included around 150 extras and were considered one of the most cost complicated in the film due to number of people.

Main parts of the film were shot from August 2019. Crew were shooting on various athletic areas such as Riegrovy sady or Za Lužánkami Stadium which served as replacement for London Olympic Stadium and the Helsinki Olympic Stadium. The stadium had to be adjusted for the shooting. Shooting concluded in November 2019.

First trailer for the film was released on 30 December 2019.

Release
The film was originally set to premiere on 13 August 2020, but was delayed for 2021 due to COVID-19 pandemic in the Czech Republic. A new date was set for 12 August 2021. It was eventually moved to 20 August 2021 during the 55th Karlovy Vary International Film Festival. Distribution for cinemas was set for 26 August 2021. On 19 September 2022 the film was released on Voyo streaming service.

Reception

Critical reception
Zátopek has received generally positive reviews from critic holding 82% on Kinobox.

Accolades
The film won the audience award at the Karlovy Vary International Film Festival garnering a 1.13 rating from the audience narrowly beating Quo Vadis, Aida?.

See also
 List of submissions to the 94th Academy Awards for Best International Feature Film
 List of Czech submissions for the Academy Award for Best International Feature Film

References

External links
 
 Zátopek at CSFD.cz 

2021 films
2020s biographical drama films
2020s sports films
2021 drama films
Czech biographical drama films
Biographical films about sportspeople
Czech historical films
Czech sports films
2020s Czech-language films
Films set in 1948
Films set in 1952
Films set in 1968
Films set in London
Films set in Helsinki
Films set in Mexico City
Films about the 1948 Summer Olympics
Films about the 1952 Summer Olympics
Films about the 1968 Summer Olympics
Films about Olympic track and field
Czech Lion Awards winners (films)